Erythronium sulevii is a plant species endemic to the Altay region of Siberia.

References

sulevii
Flora of Siberia
Flora of Russia
Plants described in 2011
Plants described in 2007